Pionersky is a rural locality (a settlement) in Novokiyevsky Selsoviet of Mazanovsky District, Amur Oblast, Russia. The population was 281 as of 2018. There are 5 streets.

Geography 
Pionersky is located 8 km north of Novokiyevsky Uval (the district's administrative centre) by road. Novokiyevka is the nearest rural locality.

References 

Rural localities in Mazanovsky District